Woodrow Green, Jr. (born June 20, 1951) is a former American football running back who played for the Kansas City Chiefs of the National Football League (NFL). Green was drafted by the Chiefs in the first round of the 1974 NFL Draft.  He is an alumnus of, set many rushing records, and was a first-team AP all-American while at Arizona State University.  Green appeared on the front cover of the Sports Illustrated November 18, 1974 issue.  His NFL career was shortened because of multiple knee injuries/surgeries.

College statistics
 1971: 208 for 1,209 and 9 TD
 1972: 209 for 1,363 and 15 TD, 9 catches for 115, consensus All-American
 1973: 184 for 1,182 and 9 TD, 22 catches for 328 and 5 TD, consensus All-American, finished eight in Heisman Trophy voting

References

1951 births
Living people
American football running backs
Arizona State Sun Devils football players
Kansas City Chiefs players
All-American college football players
People from Columbia County, Oregon
Players of American football from Portland, Oregon